Muhammad Sharif was an Indian social reformer,  philosopher and poet.

Birth and early life 
Santa Shishunala Sharifa was born on 7 March 1819 in Shishuvinahala, a village in Shigganvi (now Shiggaon) taluk (in Haveri district), Karnataka.
He was the son of an Imam Saheb, who was a disciple of Hajaresha Qadri, whose dream was to unite Hinduism and Islam. Hajaresha Qadri used to give “Linga Deeksha”, or initiation by tying a linga around the neck of a disciple, as per the Lingayat tradition. His father used to teach him Ramayana, Mahabharata, and even the teachings of Allama Prabhu. Legend has it that Shishunala Sharifa was conceived with the blessings of Basavanna.

Even when Sharifa was a boy, He was taught the tenets of both religions. In his birthplace Shishuvinahala, even today, both Hindus and Muslims revere him as a saint at the same temple.

Meeting Govinda Bhatta 

Govinda Bhatta, a Brahmin, was famous in the region as an unconventional Master. He cared little for caste or religion, and spent more time with anyone who invited him, and ate anywhere he felt like eating. Other Brahmins could not stomach his way of life.

One day, Govinda Bhatta came to Shishuvinahala, and Sharifa's father found Him seated under a tree. He asked Him to accept His son as disciple. In front of the father, Govinda Bhatta called the young boy and said, “Hey Sharifa, who is your father?” The villagers laughed, but were shocked when the boy brashly said, “What kind of question are you asking? Your father and mine are the same!”. Govinda Bhatta laughed, patted the boy on the back and said, “Excellent, Sharifa! The land is fertile, the seed will sprout well. O Imam, leave Him to my care! From today, He is my son!”

Sharifa followed Govinda Bhatta back to His village. The boy was found to be curious about matters beyond logic and the world, and about the secrets of creation. These qualities were nurtured by Govinda Bhatta. Society was surprised by their closeness. In the eyes of Muslims, the Master was a Kaafir (infidel) and for Brahmins, the boy was a Mleccha(outsider).

Thread Ceremony 
One day, Govinda Bhatta was seated with some Brahmins at the village crossroad. Just then, Sharifa comes by. The Master calls Him to sit, and the two sit very closely. The others were offended, and say, “Does that Muslim look like a Brahmin to you? You have no sense of cleanliness or social status!” Bhatta laughs, saying, “Just because you are born a Brahmin, do you think you’ll become one? None of you is a greater Brahmin than this boy!”. He takes off His sacred thread puts it around Sharifa, embracing Him tightly. Sharifa, overcome with feeling, prostrates himself at the Master's feet. The Brahmins were highly offended.

The Mullah 
One day, a Mullah asks Sharifa, “So, I see you’ve stopped coming to the mosque! Do you even remember what Namaz is?” To this, Sharifa calmly replies, pointing at His own body, “I dwell in this mosque, so why go and come? I am in constant worship of “I AM”, so what can be greater Namaz?” The Mullah was dumbstruck.

Later years 

Sharifa's parents force him to marry. Sharifa goes to Bhatta and asks, “If I become a Samsari, won’t i get stuck in desire and illusion?” The Master replies, “Why are you worried? Even in the worst rain, does wind become wet? Does light become soaked? So go and get married!”

Sharifa married, and had a daughter. He joins work as a schoolmaster in Karadagi, to support the family. However, His wife passes away shortly. Sharifa's neighbours adopt the child, and Sharifa quits His job. He starts participating in folk dramas, teaching simple lessons through daily experiences. Sharifa went through extreme poverty, often going without meals. However, Govinda Bhatta stood by Him through all His troubles.

After Govinda Bhatta left His body, Sharifa lived on for another twenty years. When He started falling ill and realised His days were few, He decided to give up His body according to “Sharana” tradition, in which ash is smeared on the body, and the feet of a Jangama, or Shaivite monk, are worshipped. The monk's feet are then placed on the head, and life is given up. Nobody agreed, but on His insistence, a Jangama by name Hirematta Karibasavayya agreed. Shishunala Sharifa left His body on 3rd July 1889 AD.

The people were left confused. Sharifa was born a Muslim but lived with Hindu. The leaders of both communities came together and agreed to perform the last rites as per both religions. The Quran was read simultaneously with the Hindu Mantras.

A Samadhisthan was constructed in Shishuvinahala, in a vast compound. There, statues of both Govinda Bhatta and Sharifa are visited by both Hindus and Muslims, to this day.

Teachings 

 When the mind gets very involved in the world and becomes agitated, hit it with the hatchet and stop it. 
 The Word of knowledge given by the Master annihilates the mind and makes all difficulties vanish.
 As one would take good care of a horse, take care of the mind by feeding it with spiritual food. At times, whip it like a horse, so that it behaves in a manner pleasing to the Master.
 This house (the body) moves around so much, yet through proper discipline, in this very house, one can experience Shiva. 
 Jiva, like a bird in a cage, has freedom only within the cage of body and mind. But, by the Grace of the Master, the bird is able to spread its wings to fly through the entire universe.
 The Holy Feet of his Master may look small and ordinary; however, they swallow up the huge ego when the head is placed at them.
 I am not the human birth, but verily the Narayana Parabramha Sadashiva.  (Na Na Embudu Nanalla)

Sharifa was known to compose poems as per the situation and sing them to spread the message. Though he never wrote down his compositions, by word of mouth many of them have been passed down to future generations. The composition "Sorutihudu Maneya Maligi" can be traced to Great Famine 1876-1888 that plagued southern and western India. People dying in millions resorted to blind beliefs and faiths some even asking him to control the famine. Though the source cannot be cited, given his composition and the dire situation the people were in, this particular composition must have come during the famine years.

Famous Compositions 
 Kodagana koli nungitha nodavva thangi
 Gudiya Nodiranna Dehada
 Alabeda Thangi Alabeda
 Tharavalla Thagi Ninna
 Biddiyabbe Muduki
 Soruthihudu Maneya Maaligi
 Ellaranthavanalla Nanna Ganda
 Mohada Hendathi Theerida Balika
 Sneha Madabekinthavala
 gudugudiya sedu nodo
 lokada kalaji
 Duddu Kettadu Nodanna
Na Na Embudu Nanalla

Film 
Santha Shishunala Sharifa is a Kannada feature film directed by T.S. Nagabharana in 1990. The main character was played by the Kannada actor Sridhar, and the supporting cast included Girish Karnad and Suman Ranganath

Sharifa's songs have been sung by famous playback singers, notably C. Ashwath, Shimoga Subbanna, Raghu Dixit and Archana Udupa.

Raghu Dixit's work has been appreciated for spreading the words of Sharifa's wisdom to the world. Raghu's self-titled debut album launched by the popular music director duo Vishal–Shekhar contains two songs "Soruthihudu Maniya Maligi" and "Gudugudiya Sedi Noda", which are compositions of Sharifa. His next album Jag Changa also has 2 songs originally written by Shishunala Sharifa "Lokada Kalaji" and "Kodagana Koli Nungitha".

References

External links
 Shishunala Sharifs poems in Kannada
 2 Shishunala Sharifs poems in Kannada
 Shishunala Sharifs poems in Kannada A good site. 
 Saint of Shishunal by Jyotsna Kamat

Kannada poets
1819 births
19th-century Indian Muslims
1889 deaths
People from Haveri district
Kannada people
19th-century Indian poets
Indian male poets
20th-century Indian poets
19th-century Indian male writers
20th-century Indian male writers